Marsden Mounds (16 R 13) is an archaeological site with components from the Poverty Point culture (1500 BCE) and the Troyville-Coles Creek period (400 to 1200 CE). It is located in Richland Parish, Louisiana, near Delhi. It was added to the NRHP on August 4, 2004, as NRIS number 04000803. It is the type site for the Marsden Phase (500-600 CE) of the Tensas Basin and Natchez Bluff regions local chronology.

Site description
The earthworks at the site include a group of five platform mounds and two portions of an earthen embankment. It and another portion of embankment are located across a large plaza  to the southwest of the other mounds.

During investigations at the site, artifacts from the Poverty Point culture were found under some of the mounds, showing that people occupied this at least as early as 1500 BC during the Archaic period. Radiocarbon dating of charcoal samples from one of the smaller mounds have been dated 400 and 1200 CE, during the Late Woodland Troyville-Coles Creek period.

The site is part of the Poverty Point Reservoir State Park. It is open to the public and accessible by foot.

See also
Culture, phase, and chronological table for the Mississippi Valley
Poverty Point
Watson Brake

References

External links
 Marsden Mounds - Louisiana Historical Markers on Waymarking.com
 Best Louisiana State Parks to Visit in the Spring

Archaeological sites on the National Register of Historic Places in Louisiana
Poverty Point culture
Troyville culture
Archaeological sites of the Coles Creek culture
Mounds in Louisiana
Geography of West Carroll Parish, Louisiana
National Register of Historic Places in West Carroll Parish, Louisiana